NMDC Limited, formerly National Mineral Development Corporation, is a central public sector undertaking. It is under the ownership of the Ministry of Steel, Government of India.

It is involved in the exploration of iron ore, copper, rock phosphate, limestone, dolomite, gypsum, bentonite, magnesite, diamond, tin, tungsten, graphite, coal etc.

It is India's largest iron ore producer and exporter, producing more than 35 million tonnes of iron ore from three mechanized mines in Chhattisgarh and Karnataka. It also operates the only mechanized diamond mine in the country at Panna in Madhya Pradesh.

NMDC is in the process of demerging its Nagarnar iron and steel plant by mid 2022, and publicly listing the demerged company.

Operating mines
 Bailadila Iron Ore Mine, Kirandul Complex, South Bastar district, Dantewada (C.G.)Steel
 Bailadila Iron Ore Mine, Bacheli Complex, South Bastar district, Dantewada (C.G.)
 Donimalai Iron Ore Mine, Donimalai, Bellary district, Karnataka (at December 2019 suspended for over a year due to a royalty dispute)
 Diamond Mining Project, Majhgawan, Panna (M.P.)

NMDC Ltd. is diversified into other raw materials for the steel industry such as low silica limestone. Production of dead burnt magnesite and further value addition is under study through its subsidiary J K Mineral Development Corporation Limited.

NMDC Ltd. has taken over a silica sand mining and beneficiation project from Uttar Pradesh State Mineral Development Corporation Ltd. The plant is designed to produce beneficiated high purity silica sand to a capacity of 300,000 tonnes per year as the raw material for production of float/sheet glass.

A memorandum of understanding has been signed between NMDC, Indian Rare Earths Limited, (IREL) and Andhra Pradesh Mineral Development Corporation to establish a joint venture for the development of Bheemunipatnam Beach Sand. The project envisages mining of beach sands, setting up of mineral separation plant for ilmenite concentrate and a downstream value addition plant for conversion of ilmenite into synthetic rutile/TiO2 slag/TiO2 pigment with pig iron as by-product.

Nagarnar Steel Plant
NMDC set up a 3 MTPA capacity greenfield Nagarnar Steel Plant based on HiSmelt technology, 16 km from Jagdalpur in Chhattisgarh state, with an estimated outlay of Rs 20000 crore.

A pure-play miner, NMDC had in 2009–10 conceived the Nagarnar steel plant with the intention of moving up the value chain and diversifying its portfolio. The idea was also to hedge itself against the vagaries of iron ore prices.

The plant site is around 16 km from Jagdalpur and 6 km from the Orissa–Chattishgarh border. The nearest railway station is Amaguda (around 2 km). The site is located on National Highway NH 30. The nearby airports are Jagdalpur, Raipur & Vishakhapatnam and the nearest seaport is Visakhapatnam located at a distance of approx 325 km. The nearest river is Indravati, located at a distance of 3 km.

Listings and shareholding 
The equity shares of NMDC are listed on the Bombay Stock Exchange and the National Stock Exchange of India.

As of February 2020, the Government of India held a 69.65% equity in NMDC. 225,339 individual shareholders hold approximately 3.79% of its shares. The balance is held by insurance companies (14.31%), foreign institutional investors (5.78%), mutual funds (4.42%), and banks (1.96%). Life Insurance Corporation of India is the largest non-promoter shareholder in the company with a 13.699% shareholding.

International 

In Australia, Legacy Iron Ore, a majority-owned NMDC company, holds majority stakes in gold and iron ore projects in Western Australia.

NMDC Limited was awarded the Corporate Social Responsibility Award Global Metals Award 2018 in the Corporate Social Responsibility category in London, the first time since inception that an Indian company received the award.

References

External links
 NMDC website

Metal companies of India
Mining companies of India
Government-owned companies of India
Industries in Hyderabad, India
Non-renewable resource companies established in 1958
Indian companies established in 1958
1958 establishments in Andhra Pradesh
Companies listed on the National Stock Exchange of India
Companies listed on the Bombay Stock Exchange